= Dianatpur =

- Village
- Location in Punjab, India Dianatpur (India)
- Coordinates: 31°27′04″N 75°46′50″E
- Country: India
- State: Punjab
- District: Jalandhar
- Tehsil: Jalandhar - I

Government
  - Type: Panchayat raj
  - Body: Gram panchayat

Area
  - Total: 118 ha (290 acres)

Population (2011)
  - Total: 334; 161/173 ♂/♀
  - Scheduled Castes: 28; 16/12 ♂/♀
  - Total Households: 78

Languages
  - Official: Punjabi
- Time zone: UTC+5:30 (IST)
- ISO 3166 code: IN-PB
- Vehicle registration: PB-08
- Website: jalandhar.gov.in

Dianatpur is a village in Jalandhar - I in Jalandhar district of Punjab State, India. It is located 35 kilometres (22 mi) from district headquarter. The village is administrated by Sarpanch an elected representative of the village.

== Demography ==
As of 2011, the village has a total number of 78 houses and a population of 334 of which 161 are males while 173 are females. According to the report published by Census India in 2011, out of the total population of the village 28 people are from Schedule Caste and the village does not have any Schedule Tribe population so far.

== See also ==
- List of villages in India
